A split decision is a type of win in combat sports.

Split decision may also refer to:

"Split Decision", a 1985 episode of Care Bears
"Split Decision", a 2004 episode from the first season of NCIS
Split Decision, a pricing game from The Price Is Right

See also
Split Decisions, a 1988 boxing film